First Methodist Church is located in Waukesha, Wisconsin. It is affiliated with the United Methodist Church. The church, designed by Henry F. Starbuck, was built in the Romanesque architectural style in 1895. It was added to the National Register of Historic Places on December 1, 1983, for its architectural significance.

References

Churches on the National Register of Historic Places in Wisconsin
United Methodist churches in Wisconsin
Romanesque Revival church buildings in Wisconsin
Churches completed in 1895
Churches in Waukesha, Wisconsin
National Register of Historic Places in Waukesha County, Wisconsin